Aleksandr Viktorovich Khoroshilov (born 16 February 1984) is a Russian World Cup alpine ski racer and specializes in slalom. He gained his first victory in 2015 in the slalom at Schladming and became the first Russian male to win a World Cup race in 34 years since Aleksandr Zhirov of the Soviet Union in 1981.

World Cup results

Season standings

Standings through 27 February 2022

Race podiums
1 win – (1 SL)     
10 podiums – (10 SL)

World Championships results

Olympic results

References

External links 

Aleksandr Khoroshilov World Cup standings at the International Ski Federation

1984 births
Russian male alpine skiers
Alpine skiers at the 2006 Winter Olympics
Alpine skiers at the 2010 Winter Olympics
Alpine skiers at the 2014 Winter Olympics
Alpine skiers at the 2018 Winter Olympics
Alpine skiers at the 2022 Winter Olympics
Olympic alpine skiers of Russia
People from Yelizovo
Living people